Cheltenham is an unincorporated community in Cheltenham Township, Pennsylvania, United States, with a ZIP code of 19012. It is located directly over the city line (Cheltenham Avenue) of Philadelphia. It also borders Northeast Philadelphia over the Fox Chase Line on the east and over Cottman Avenue (PA 73) on the north side. The community is listed for statistical purposes as the Cheltenham Village census-designated place.

By the mid-1980s, many Korean Americans moved out of Logan and moved into Cheltenham and other communities.

Cheltenham is represented by Madeleine Dean in the 4th Congressional District.

, Taiwanese airline EVA Air provides a private bus service to and from John F. Kennedy International Airport in New York City for customers based in the Philadelphia area. It stops in Cheltenham.

References 

Unincorporated communities in Montgomery County, Pennsylvania
Unincorporated communities in Pennsylvania
Census-designated places in Montgomery County, Pennsylvania
Census-designated places in Pennsylvania
Cheltenham Township, Pennsylvania